Edward Fisher (born 16 April 1994) is a British rower.

Rowing career
Fisher began rowing for the Loughborough Rowing Club at a local village fete. He made his British junior debut in 2010 in a match against France. He won two gold medals at the 2015 Essen International Regata before winning bronze medals at the 2015 and 2016 World Rowing U23 Championships. He made his senior British debut at the 2017 World Cup. He won a silver medal at the 2017 World Rowing Championships in Sarasota, Florida, as part of the lightweight quadruple sculls with Zak Lee-Green, Gavin Horsburgh and Peter Chambers.

References

Living people
1992 births
British male rowers
World Rowing Championships medalists for Great Britain